Rabinder Singh may refer to:
Rabinder Singh (intelligence officer), former officer in India's intelligence agency suspected of being a CIA mole
Rabinder Singh (judge), English High Court of Justice Judge